Robert Coppée (23 April 1895 Haine-Saint-Pierre – 1970) was a Belgian football (soccer) player who competed in the 1920 and 1924 Summer Olympics. He was a member of the Belgium team, which won the gold medal in the football tournament. During the tournament he scored four times in three matches, including a hat-trick against Spain.

References

1895 births
1970 deaths
Belgian footballers
Footballers at the 1920 Summer Olympics
Medalists at the 1920 Summer Olympics
Footballers at the 1924 Summer Olympics
Olympic footballers of Belgium
Olympic gold medalists for Belgium
Belgium international footballers
Olympic medalists in football
Association football midfielders
20th-century Belgian people